Carlo Bonafaccia (24 March 1612 – 18 October 1683) was a Roman Catholic prelate who served as Bishop of Terni (1675–1683) and Bishop of Ortona a Mare e Campli (1653–1675).

Biography
Carlo Bonafaccia was born in Rome, Italy on 24 March 1612. On 3 February 1653, he was appointed during the papacy of Pope Innocent X as Bishop of Ortona a Mare e Campli. On 9 February 1653, he was consecrated bishop by Marcello Santacroce, Bishop of Tivoli, with Giovanni Lucas Moncalvi, Bishop of Guardialfiera, and Riginaldo Lucarini, Bishop of Città della Pieve, serving as co-consecrators. On 27 May 1675, he was appointed during the papacy of Pope Clement X as Bishop of Terni. He served as Bishop of Terni until his death on 18 October 1683.

References

External links and additional sources
 (for Chronology of Bishops) 
 (for Chronology of Bishops) 

17th-century Italian Roman Catholic bishops
Bishops appointed by Pope Innocent X
Bishops appointed by Pope Clement X
1612 births
1683 deaths